Oliver August is the Chief Technology and Innovation Officer at Nation Media Group, one of the largest content companies in Africa.  August was previously the CEO of Mawingu Networks, a data connectivity company is backed by Microsoft and serving rural Africans as well as product lead at HelloFresh in London and an entrepreneur-in-residence at Viaplay in Stockholm. August came to the tech sector after an MBA and a career in news media. He was the Africa and Europe editor of The Economist, responsible for managing teams of writers, analysts and designers. He has also worked as a journalist in America and Asia. He was a staff correspondent based in Baghdad, Beijing, Beirut, Damascus, Nairobi, New York and Singapore.

August started his career at The Times of London. He covered financial markets in America, Europe and Asia, and worked as a war correspondent in Bosnia, Afghanistan and Iraq. His writing on Germany in 1998 won him the Anglo-German Foundation Journalism Prize. In 2012 August was named "Journalist of the year" at the Diageo Africa Business Reporting Awards.

August's first book, Along the Wall and Watchtowers (HarperCollins, 1999), chronicles a journey along the former Iron Curtain and examines the political, economic and social consequences of German reunification. His second book, Inside the Red Mansion (Houghton Mifflin & John Murray, 2007) describes the epic search for Lai Changxing, China's most wanted man, and details the emergence of an entrepreneurial class in post-Communist China. The book was translated into eleven languages.

August grew up in Canada and Germany. His father was a theatre director and his mother an architect. He has a bachelor's degree in philosophy, politics and economics from Oxford University, a master's degree in journalism and international relations from City University, London, a certificate in Mandarin Chinese from the School of Oriental and African Studies (SOAS) in London, and an MBA from the Saïd Business School at Oxford University.

August has appeared on the BBC, NPR, CNN and CNBC. He has contributed opinion articles to the Los Angeles Times, the Wall Street Journal, and the Washington Post.

References

Books
Along the Wall and Watchtowers, HarperCollins, 1999
Inside the Red Mansion, Houghton Mifflin, 2007

External links
oliveraugust.com 
Anglo-German Foundation site
A short film about the making of the book ''Inside the Red Mansion
Journalisted - Articles by Oliver August

German male journalists
German journalists
Living people
German expatriates in England
German male writers
Year of birth missing (living people)